The 2021–22 Copa de la Reina de Fútbol was the 40th edition of the Spanish women's association football national cup. Barcelona were the defending champions, having won the last two editions. They defended the title with a 6-1 win over Sporting de Huelva.

Format changes
A total of 52 clubs competed in this year's tournament, making it the most participants in the cup's history. All 16 teams team in Primera División, all 32 teams from Segunda División Pro, and the four promoted teams from Primera Nacional de Fútbol. Reserve teams are excluded from participating in the tournament.

Schedule and format
All ties are played in a one match decider at a home ground. The first draw for the tournament took place on 24 September 2021, at Royal Spanish Football Federation (RFEF) headquarters in Las Rozas.

Notes
Single-match rounds ending in a tie will be decided in extra time; and if it persists, by a penalty shootout.

First round

Draw
The draw was held on 24 September 2021, in the RFEF headquarters in Las Rozas.

Matches

Second round

Draw
The draw was held on 15 October 2021, in the RFEF headquarters in Las Rozas.

Matches

Third round

Draw
The draw was held on 4 January 2021, in the RFEF headquarters in Las Rozas.

Matches

Round of 16

Draw
The draw was held on 11 February 2022, in the RFEF headquarters in Las Rozas.

Matches

Quarter-final

Draw
The draw was held on 4 March 2022, in the RFEF headquarters in Las Rozas.

Matches

Semi-final

Draw 
The draw was held on 12 May 2022, in the RFEF headquarters in Las Rozas.

Matches

Final

Top goalscorers

References

External links
Royal Spanish Football Federation
Copa de la Reina at La Liga website

Women
Copa de la Reina
Copa de la Reina de Fútbol seasons